Don Moen (born April 29, 1960) is a former linebacker who played thirteen seasons in the Canadian Football League for the Toronto Argonauts. Moen holds the record for most games played in a career as an Argonaut with 222. During Moen's tenure in the CFL he won 2 Grey Cup championships with Toronto in 1983 and 1991.

In 2007 Moen was made a member of the "All-time Argos" team, joining Argo greats such as Mike O'Shea, Doug Flutie and Mike "Pinball" Clemons.

External links
 Argos Heroes

1960 births
Canadian football linebackers
Living people
People from Swift Current
Players of Canadian football from Saskatchewan
Toronto Argonauts players
University of British Columbia alumni
UBC Thunderbirds football players